In enzymology, a tetrachloroethene reductive dehalogenase is an enzyme that catalyzes the chemical reaction. This is a member of reductive dehalogenase enzyme family.

trichloroethene + chloride + acceptor  tetrachloroethene + reduced acceptor

The 3 substrates of this enzyme are trichloroethene, chloride, and acceptor, whereas its two products are tetrachloroethene and reduced acceptor.

This enzyme belongs to the family of oxidoreductases.  The systematic name of this enzyme class is acceptor:trichloroethane oxidoreductase (chlorinating). This enzyme is also called tetrachloroethene reductase.  This enzyme participates in tetrachloroethene degradation.

Note that the physiologically relevant reaction actually occurs in the reverse direction from that shown above.  In other words, in the bacterial species where this enzyme is found, tetrachloroethene is reductively dechlorinated to trichloroethene and chloride.

This enzyme is one member of a family of enzymes including trichloroethene dehalogenase and vinyl chloride dehalogenase.  The other members of this family do not have their own EC numbers at present.

Reductive dehalogenases are key enzymes for anaerobic respiratory process, termed organohalide respiration.

References

Further reading 

 
 
 
 
 

EC 1.97.1
Enzymes of unknown structure